Ferndale is an unincorporated community in Umatilla County, Oregon, United States.

Ferndale was once a station on the Walla Walla Valley Railway, which served the local fruit orchards, and the site of a fruit-packing warehouse. The next station south on the line was at Sunnyside. Ferndale Elementary School is part of the Milton-Freewater Unified School District.

References

External links
Image of old fruit packing shed in Ferndale on former WWVR right-of-way

Unincorporated communities in Umatilla County, Oregon
Unincorporated communities in Oregon